Animal behavior is the area of science also known as ethology.

'Animal behavior may also refer to:

 Animal Behavior (film), a 1989 comedy
 Animal Behaviour (journal), a scientific journal
 "Animal Behavior", a 1992 song from the album Transmutation (Mutatis Mutandis) by Praxis
 Animal Behaviour (film), an Oscar-nominated animated short film by Alison Snowden and David Fine

See also
 Animal mobbing behaviour, an antipredator adaptation in prey species
 Animal sexual behaviour, mating or reproductively motivated activities
 Behavior (disambiguation)